Timo Schäfer (born 9 August 1982) is a German former professional racing cyclist, who currently works as the team manager of UCI Continental team . He rode in the men's team time trial at the 2016 UCI Road World Championships.

References

External links
 

1982 births
Living people
German male cyclists
Place of birth missing (living people)
21st-century German people